Amphipneustes davidi is a species of sea urchin of the family Temnopleuridae. Their armour is covered with spines. It is placed in the genus Amphipneustes and lives in the sea. Amphipneustes davidi was first scientifically described in 2010 by Madon-Senez.

See also 
Amphipneustes bifidus (Mortensen, 1950)
Amphipneustes brevisternalis (Koehler, 1926)
Amphipneustes koehleri (Mortensen, 1905)

References 

Amphipneustes
Animals described in 2010